Rupela saetigera is a moth in the family Crambidae. It was described by Carl Heinrich in 1937. It is found in Paraná, Brazil.

The wingspan is about 23 mm. The wings are shining white.

References

Moths described in 1937
Schoenobiinae
Taxa named by Carl Heinrich